Heinrich Georg Friedrich Schröder (28 September 1810 – 12 May 1885) was a German natural scientist (physicist, chemist), mathematician and educator.

Together with Theodor von Dusch, he was credited with the development of a method of air sterilization by filtration through cotton, used for food preservation (1853).

In 1858, he published a sketch about an optical illusion which now bears his name.

References

External links
 

1810 births
1885 deaths
19th-century German physicists
19th-century German chemists
19th-century German mathematicians
19th-century German educators